Wilhelm Siegmund Frei (5 September 1885 – 27 January 1943) was a German dermatologist best known for his contributions to Durand-Nicolas-Favre disease, a sexually transmitted disease found mainly in tropical and subtropical climates. He is also known for the Frei Test, which was developed in 1925 for the detection of lymphogranuloma venereum (LGV).

Early life 
Wilhelm Siegmund Frei was born in Neustadt, Upper Silesia. His father, Emil Frei, was a mining firm director, from Neustadt. His mother was Frederika Ring, who came from Austria. Wilhelm had two sisters, Gerta Frei (1887 — presumably killed by Nazis) and Josephina Frei (1888).

Life 
Wilhelm studied medicine in Freiburg, Germany, and went on to get his doctorate in Göttingen in 1913. He met Magda Frankfurter (1885–1973) when they were both studying medicine in Freiburg and was married on 12 January 1912. They had their first child Marianne, later that year on 7 November 1912, and their second child Fritz was born on 12 December 1915.

Due to the rise of the Nazis and bad times looming ahead in Germany, he immigrated to New York with his family and went to work at the Montefiore Hospital in the Bronx from 1937 until he fell ill and died on 27 January 1943, leaving behind his wife and three children at the age of 58.

References 

 Frei Darrow, Marianne P., Daughter of Wilhelm Siegmund Frei
 Nagar R, Pande S, Khopkar U. Intradermal tests in dermatology-I: Tests for infectious diseases. Indian J Dermatol Venereol Leprol 2006;72:461-465
 Bedson SP, Barwell CF, King EJ, Bishop LW. The Laboratory Diagnosis of Lymphogranuloma Venereum. J Clin Pathol 1949;2:241-9.

External links 
 Wilhelm Siegmund Frei incorporated text

1885 births
1943 deaths
20th-century German people
German dermatologists
American dermatologists
Academic staff of the University of Breslau
University of Göttingen alumni
Silesian Jews
Jewish emigrants from Nazi Germany to the United States
People from the Province of Silesia
People from Prudnik